Bombshell is the second soundtrack album by the cast of the American musical television series Smash. It was released by Columbia Records on February 12, 2013. and sold 16,000 copies in its first week. As of the week ending March 3, 2013, it has sold 26,000 copies.

Background
This is the second album released for the show, the first one being The Music of Smash. It was released by Columbia Records on February 12, 2013. The album was released in standard and deluxe versions. The standard version features 22 songs, all originals, divided into two acts. The deluxe version being sold at Target features an interview with songwriters Marc Shaiman and Scott Wittman, and versions of three of the songs by different singers than on the standard version.

The Soundtrack features songs from both season 1 and season 2. The 22 original songs  make up the musical, complete with liner notes detailing the plot of Bombshell.
On January 6, 2013 the 22 tracks that would make the final cut were revealed online. Three days later on January 9 the release date of the soundtrack was revealed.

While the original songs from season 1 mostly amounted to Act one numbers only, the majority of the then-unreleased songs made up Act 2, thereby fleshing out the story.

Track listing
Act One 

Act Two 

Target Deluxe Edition (Bonus disc)

Critical reception

Heather Phares of Allmusic described the album release as "a smart move", arguing that the original songs written for the in-universe Marilyn Monroe musical of the same name "were among the most vibrant [on the show], capturing the passion that fuels staging a Broadway show". She adds that "Bombshell plays like a true original cast recording, tracing the show's plot in its liner notes and separating its songs into acts". She notes that while one of the major plot-points of the first season was over whether Karen or Ivy would end up playing the lead role, "the cast recording features both wannabe Marilyns, allowing each performer to play to her strengths, whether they're singing together, as on Let Me Be Your Star, or separate". She sums up the faux cast recording by saying, "even if Bombshell isn't a real Broadway musical, it hits all the notes a production like this should, and showcases the most appealing parts of Smash in the process".

Haley H of StageDoorDish says, "Bombshell is big, it’s bold, and it’s flashy—with a little sentiment thrown in. Exactly what you would expect from a musical based on the life of Marilyn Monroe and her professional and personal triumphs and pitfalls". She adds that "the previously unheard tracks [later performed throughout season 2] help to complete the plot, with less focus being placed on the “Joe DiMaggio years”, with songs featuring Marilyn’s other romantic interests...as well as Marilyn’s mother and her childhood, [thereby giving] listeners...the complete Marilyn Monroe story". She says that "Bombshell’s main goal is to give a peek behind the curtain at Marilyn Monroe’s life" and that "with the addition of new numbers, the listener is given that opportunity and more of a chance to connect with a different side of Marilyn. A side that is more human and less iconic...[but also] doesn’t let the listener forget the sexier and popularized version of Marilyn". She concludes by saying "Bombshell’s songs are both catchy and heartwarming. The score ranges from a string accompaniment to a jazzy sax number, and sounds akin to the classic Broadway style of music. With the perfect combination of new songs and fan favorites, like “History Is Made at Night,” Bombshell will leave you begging for the show to come to Broadway."

Daphne Miller of Idolator said, "Shaiman and Wittman clearly know what they're doing and the references to Monroe's life are amusing, but as a story told through music, Bombshell simply doesn’t stand up on its own." She says later on that "despite [the album's] firepower, Bombshell just isn’t a quality musical. The album has a few fun tracks and is better than the watered-down covers on the initial Smash release, but it’s not worth owning". Comparing the release with a similar soundtrack by the cast of Nashville, Miller commented, "Both shows are frothy diversions, but the country jams on the Nashville soundtrack transcend the soapiness and cohere into a truly enjoyable album. With Smash, the campiness makes the generic melodies actually sing, but the flipside is that Bombshell doesn’t have legs when, well, you’re not staring at a great pair of legs."

Charts

References

External links
 
  

2013 soundtrack albums
Television soundtracks
Columbia Records soundtracks
Smash (TV series)
Works about Marilyn Monroe